Axtaçı or Akhtachi or Akhtachy may refer to:
Axtaçı, Agsu, Azerbaijan
Axtaçı, Kurdamir, Azerbaijan
Axtaçı, Sabirabad, Azerbaijan
Axtaçı Şirvan, Azerbaijan
Akhtachi, Iran, a village in Hamadan Province, Iran
Akhtachi Rural District, in West Azerbaijan Province, Iran
Akhtachi-ye Gharbi Rural District, in West Azerbaijan Province, Iran
Akhtachi-ye Mahali Rural District, in West Azerbaijan Province, Iran
Akhtachi-ye Sharqi Rural District, in West Azerbaijan Province, Iran